Texas Christian University (TCU) is a private research university in Fort Worth, Texas. It was established in 1873 by brothers Addison and Randolph Clark as the Add-Ran Male & Female College. It is affiliated with the Christian Church (Disciples of Christ).

The campus is located on  about 3 miles (5 km) from downtown Fort Worth. TCU is affiliated with, but not governed by, the Disciples of Christ. The university consists of eight constituent colleges and schools and has a classical liberal arts curriculum. It is classified among "R2: Doctoral Universities – High research activity".

TCU's mascot is Superfrog, based on the Texas state reptile; the horned frog. For most varsity sports, TCU competes in the Big 12 conference of the NCAA's Division I. As of Fall 2021, the university enrolls around 11,938 students, with 10,222 being undergraduates.

History

Origins in Fort Worth, 1869–1873

The East Texas brothers Addison and Randolph Clark, with the support of their father Joseph A. Clark, first founded Texas Christian University. The Clarks were scholar-preacher/teachers associated with the Restoration Movement. These early leaders of the Restoration Movement were the spiritual ancestors of the modern Disciples of Christ, as well as major proponents of education.

Following their return from fighting for the Confederacy in the Civil War, brothers Addison and Randolph established a children's preparatory school in Fort Worth. This school, known as the Male & Female Seminary of Fort Worth, operated from 1869 to 1874. Both Clarks nourished a vision for an institution of higher education that would be Christian in character, but non-sectarian in spirit and intellectually open-minded. They purchased five blocks of land in downtown Fort Worth in 1869 for that purpose.

But from 1867 to 1874, the character of Fort Worth changed substantially due to the commercial influence of the Chisholm Trail, the principal route for moving Texas cattle to the Kansas rail heads. A huge influx of cattle, men, and money transformed the sleepy frontier village into a booming, brawling cowtown. The area around the property purchased by the Clarks for their college soon became the town's vice district, an unrelieved stretch of saloons, gambling halls, dance parlors, and bawdy houses catering to the rough tastes of the Chisholm Trail cowboys. Its rough and rowdy reputation had, by 1872, acquired it the nickname of "Hell's Half Acre" (the heart of which is today occupied by the Fort Worth Convention Center and the Fort Worth Water Gardens).

The Clarks feared that this negative environment undermined the fledgling university's mission. They began to look for an alternative site for their college, and they found it at Thorp Spring, a small community and stagecoach stop  in Hood County to the southwest near the frontier of Comanche and Kiowa territory.

Move to Thorp Spring, 1873–1895

In 1873 the Clark brothers moved South to Thorp Spring and founded Add-Ran Male & Female College. TCU recognizes 1873 as its founding year, as it continues to preserve the original college through the AddRan College of Liberal Arts.

Add-Ran College was one of the first coeducational institutions of higher education west of the Mississippi River, and the very first in Texas. This was a progressive step at a time when only 15% of the national college enrollment was female and almost all were enrolled at women's colleges.

At Thorp Spring the fledgling college expanded quickly. The inaugural enrollment in Fall 1873 was 13 students, though this number rose to 123 by the end of the first term.  Shortly thereafter, annual enrollment ranged from 200 to 400. At one time more than 100 counties of Texas were represented in the student body. The Clark brothers also recruited prestigious professors from all over the South to join them at Thorp Spring. The standards of the school and the efficiency of its work came to be recognized throughout the United States, and many graduates were welcomed at universities throughout the country.

In 1889 Add-Ran College formed an official partnership with what would become the Christian Church (Disciples of Christ). This relationship with the church was a partnership of heritage and values, though the church never enjoyed any administrative role at TCU. Later that year the Clark brothers handed over all land, buildings, and assets and allowed the growing university to continue as a private institution; their only compensation was a request that their descendants should have free tuition (though this stipulation was never enforced).

In keeping with the transition, in 1889 the school was renamed Add-Ran Christian University, though by this time it had quite outgrown the property.

Move to Waco, roots of rivalry, 1895–1910
The need for a larger population and transportation base prompted the university to relocate to Waco from 1895 to 1910; it purchased the campus of the defunct Waco Female College. The institution was renamed Texas Christian University in 1902, though almost immediately it was dubbed as its acronym TCU. It was during this 15-year sojourn in Waco that TCU in 1896 entered the ranks of intercollegiate football and adopted its school colors of purple and white, as well as its distinctive Horned Frog mascot. This also laid the groundwork for the rivalry between TCU and cross-town school in Waco, Baylor University. "The Revivalry" - as the rivalry is known on both sides - is the most even rivalry in collegiate football at any level, with the series currently led by TCU 55–52–7, and with neither school ever enjoying more than an eight-game win streak; TCU won the eight consecutive games from 1964 to 1971 and Baylor won eight consecutive from 1974 from 1981.

Return to Fort Worth, 1910–present

In 1910 a fire of unknown origin destroyed the university's Main Administration building. A rebuilding project was planned, but before reconstruction could begin, a group of enterprising Fort Worth businessmen offered the university $200,000 in rebuilding money ($5,114,505.00 in 2018 currency) and a  campus as an inducement to return to Fort Worth. This move brought TCU home to the source of its institutional roots and completed its 40-year transition from a frontier college to an urban university.

The TCU campus at its present location in Fort Worth in 1910–11 consisted of four buildings: Clark Hall and Goode Hall, the men's dormitories; Jarvis Hall, the women's dormitory; and the Main Administration building (now Reed Hall).

Two of these four original buildings still remain: Reed Hall (originally the Main Administration building) and Jarvis Hall (originally a women's dormitory, but since renovated as an administrative building). Goode Hall was demolished in 1958 and replaced by the new Clark Hall, originally a men's dormitory. It was renovated in 2008 as a coed residence hall. The original Clark Hall was demolished in 1959 and replaced by Sadler Hall, the current main administration building.

The university received its first and a huge charitable endowment in 1923, from Mary Couts Burnett, the recent widow of Samuel Burk Burnett, a rancher, banker, and oilman. Married in 1892, Mary Couts came to believe that her husband was trying to kill her and she sought a divorce. Instead, Burk Burnett had his wife committed to a mental asylum, where she struggled for more than 10 years to regain her freedom. With the help of her physician, she eventually succeeded and was released in 1922, only to find that her husband had recently died and left her nothing.

She challenged the will and eventually secured half of her late husband's estate ($4 million, worth $80.3 million in 2018 currency). The long years of incarceration had taken a toll on Couts Burnett and people worried about her health. In her 1923 will, she bequeathed her entire estate, including a half-interest in the gigantic 6666 ("Four Sixes") Ranch, to TCU. She died in 1924, and about 100 female students from TCU attended her funeral in honor of her gift. She lived long enough to see construction begin on the TCU building that today bears her name, the Mary Couts Burnett Library.

The Mary Couts Burnett Library was built on the site of the school's first athletic field, Clark Field, a cinder track with a baseball diamond. Clark Field was moved to the west of the Library. Since their first season of play in 1896, the TCU football team had gained increasing attention and success every year and joined the Southwest Conference in 1923. In 1928 the school received a private donation from local newspaper magnate and philanthropist Amon G. Carter, and in 1930 the school opened Amon G. Carter Stadium, where the TCU football team still plays.

Campus

The TCU campus is divided into roughly three areas: a residential area, an academic area, and Worth Hills. The two main areas of campus, the residential and academic areas, are separated by University Drive, an oak-lined street that bisects the campus. Residence halls, the Student Union, and the Campus Commons are all located to the West of University Drive, while the library, chapel, and most academic buildings are located to the East of it. All of TCU's surrounding streets are lined by live oaks.

A third area of campus, known as Worth Hills, lies to the west across Stadium Drive and adjacent to the football stadium. Worth Hills is home to all of the university's fraternity and sorority houses, though plans to move all Greek housing to a new location have been underway for several years. As of 2021, three new sophomore, junior, and senior dormitories have been built, which are Hays Hall, Arnold Hall, and Richards Hall.

Roughly half of TCU undergraduate students live on campus. Housing is divided among 16 residence halls and on-campus apartment complexes. Students are required to live in an on-campus residence hall, most of which are co-ed, for at least their freshman and sophomore years.

The neo-classical beaux-arts architecture at TCU incorporates features consistent with much of the Art Deco-influenced architecture of older buildings throughout Fort Worth. Most of the buildings at TCU are constructed with a specially blended golden brick tabbed by brick suppliers as "TCU buff." Nearly all of the buildings feature red-tile roofs, while the oldest buildings on campus, including Jarvis Hall, Sadler Hall, and the Bailey Building, are supported by columns of various styles.

A notable exception to this rule is Robert Carr Chapel, which was the first building on campus to be constructed of bricks other than TCU buff. The chapel is built of a distinctive salmon-colored brick, a deviation that caused alumni to protest when the building opened in 1953.

TCU is home to the Starpoint School, a laboratory school for students in grades 1–6 with learning differences.  Starpoint's goal is to develop advanced educational techniques for helping students with learning disabilities. KinderFrogs School, an early-intervention laboratory pre-school for children with Down syndrome, is housed in the same building as Starpoint. TCU is the only university in the nation with two on-campus laboratory schools in special education. The laboratory schools, both programs of the College of Education, are located near Sherley Hall and Colby Hall.

Since 2006, much of the campus has been under construction, and many buildings have been either renovated or replaced. The old Student Center was demolished in 2008 and replaced with Scharbauer Hall, which opened in 2010 and houses the bulk of AddRan College's offices and classrooms. Construction is also currently underway to renovate the dance building, and a new academic building for Brite Divinity School is being erected behind the Religion Complex. A major renovation of the library and a new residence hall are also planned. 

The 717-seat, $10 million Van Cliburn Concert Hall at TCU opened in April 2022 with a month of celebration events, as part of the $53 million TCU Music Center which opened in 2020. It joins the existing TCU concert halls Ed Landreth Hall and PepsiCo Recital Hall. Van Cliburn Concert Hall will be the early round venue for the June 2022 Sixteenth Van Cliburn International Piano Competition, returning the competition to TCU's campus where it was first held in 1962 as the First Van Cliburn International Piano Competition.

Academics

Admissions

Undergraduate 

The 2022 annual ranking of U.S. News & World Report categorizes TCU as "more selective." For the Class of 2025 (enrolled fall 2021), TCU received 19,782 applications and accepted 10,606 (53.6%). Of those accepted, 2,560 enrolled, a yield rate (the percentage of accepted students who choose to attend the university) of 24.1%. TCU's freshman retention rate is 91.3%, with 83% going on to graduate within six years.

TCU also enrolls a high percentage of transfer students. Roughly 20 percent of TCU's annual incoming undergraduate class consists of transfer students. 

The enrolled first-year class of 2025 had the following standardized test scores: the middle 50% range (25th percentile-75th percentile) of SAT scores was 1140-1345, while the middle 50% range of ACT scores was 26-31.

The university experienced a record number of applicants in 2011, when over 19,000 students applied (a 5,000-student increase from 2010). The applicant pool also set a record with 60% applicants from out of state, whereas usually 1/3 of applicants were from out-of-state. While heightened national recognition due to TCU's victory in the 2011 Rose Bowl is one contributing factor, the university has experienced a steady growth for some time. In 2000, only 4,500 students applied. 

High school seniors who have been accepted must maintain solid academic performance senior year during the spring and not show signs of senioritis; in 2012, the admissions dean sent letters to 100 college-bound seniors asking them to explain poor performance senior year, and threatening to rescind offers of admission without satisfactory letters of explanation for the slump.

Rankings

TCU is classified as a Doctoral University: Higher Research Activity by the Carnegie Foundation. TCU is accredited by the Southern Association of Colleges and Schools. TCU is currently (2021) ranked by U.S. News & World Report as No. 80 among National Universities.

Academic divisions

The university offers 117 undergraduate majors, 62 master's programs, and 25 doctoral programs. Among the university's most popular majors are Business, which accounts for roughly 25% of TCU undergraduates, and Journalism/Strategic Communications, which accounts for roughly 20% of TCU undergraduates. Nursing and Education are also popular majors, and many students choose to major in more than one field.

The Neeley School of Business is among the nation's most respected business schools. The Neeley School was recently ranked as the No. 28 best undergraduate business school in the country by Bloomberg BusinessWeek. It continues to expand following a $500,000 donation from Alumni Abe Issa for the construction the Abe Issa Field Sales Lab which will be located within the future Neeley Sales and Consumer Insights Center in the Spencer and Marlene Hays Business Commons.

TCU has always been an educational partner to the US military and serves host to reserve officer training corps (ROTC) programs for two different service branches, the US Air Force ROTC's Detachment 845 "Flying Frogs" and the US Army ROTC's "Horned Frog Battalion". Each year, approximately 3% of TCU's graduating seniors go on to serve as commissioned officers in the US armed forces. 

During World War II, TCU was one of 131 colleges and universities nationally that took part in the V-12 Navy College Training Program which offered students a path to a Navy commission.

AddRan College of Liberal Arts
Bob Schieffer College of Communication
College of Education
College of Fine Arts
College of Science and Engineering
Harris College of Nursing and Health Sciences
M. J. Neeley School of Business
Anne Burnett Marion School of Medicine
School of Interdisciplinary Studies
John V. Roach Honors College  

In addition, TCU hosts the Brite Divinity School, a separate institution run by the Disciples of Christ that is housed on TCU's campus and whose students have full access and use of TCU facilities. In 2015, TCU and the University of North Texas Health Science Center announced the creation of an MD-granting medical school jointly administered by the two institutions. The school accepted its first class of 60 students in 2019 with plans for 240 students when fully enrolled.

The school operates the Texas Christian University Rhino Initiative, active in South Africa.

Student life

Student body

The student population at TCU in 2020–2021 was 11,379, with 9,704 undergraduates and 1,675 graduate students. Women make up about 58% of the student population, while men make up about 42%. Undergraduates matriculate from all fifty states led by Texas at 54%. 
The fields of nursing, education, and advertising-public relations tend to be the majors that attract the most women, while business, political science, and a host of liberal arts majors are more balanced. A few areas of study at TCU, such as engineering and the sciences, are typically disproportionate with men, though even in those areas the percentage of female students tends to be higher than those of other comparable universities.

The student and faculty populations are overwhelmingly non-Hispanic white, but the minority population has seen increased rates over the past few years, especially for Hispanics. The school has also tried to achieve stronger diversity by hosting "Black Senior Weekend", "Hispanic Senior Experience", and offering full scholarships to a select number of exceptional minority high school students in North Texas with economically disadvantaged backgrounds.

Student organizations and events
TCU sponsors over 200 official student organizations including Amnesty International, Habitat for Humanity, Invisible Children and others. Students may also compete in intramural sports including basketball and shuffleboard, or join various other sport-hobby groups, such as the TCU Quidditch League.

Many students involve themselves in various campus ministries, such as Disciples on Campus, a Christian Church (Disciples of Christ) student group. Other groups include Ignite, a nondenominational campus ministry; Catholic Community, a large and active group; TCU Wesley, a Methodist group; the Latter-Day Saint Student Association (LDSSA); and Cru, a nondenominational evangelical student ministry. Most religious groups on campus are Christian-based, although TCU also sponsors Hillel, a Jewish student group, and the Muslim Students Association (MSA). Additionally, each year TCU Housing and Residential Life allows students to apply to live in the Interfaith Living Learning Community (LLC), in which the residents spend the year living alongside neighbors of various religious beliefs.

At the beginning of each fall semester, TCU's student government holds a large concert on the Campus Commons. In 2008, TCU celebrated completion of the Brown-Lupton Union by hosting popular country artist Pat Green. In Fall of 2009, it held a concert by OneRepublic following a football victory over Texas State. Lady Antebellum performed in 2010, and The Fray in 2011. Blake Shelton performed in 2012, Little Big Town in 2013 and Jason Derulo performed in the campus commons in 2014. These fall concerts are free to all students.

Student media
The Bob Schieffer College of Communication circulates a number of student-run publications:
 "Skiff x 360" (Skiff by 360), previously The Daily Skiff, is TCU's weekly newspaper founded in 2013 in association with tcu360. The original daily was published since 1902. The weekly publication is published on Thursdays.
 TCU360.com, founded in July 2011, is the online news platform that hosts original 360 content as well as content from all the other student media platforms.
 Image Magazine is TCU's student magazine, published once a semester and focuses on investigative, in-depth campus issues.
 The Horned Frog is the school yearbook.
 TCU broadcasts its own radio station, KTCU-FM 88.7, "The Choice." KTCU can be heard throughout much of Fort Worth/Dallas, and offers programming which includes music, talk, and live broadcasts Horned Frog football, basketball, and baseball games.

Other student-run media include:
eleven40seven is TCU's student-run, undergraduate journal of the arts. Originally started by the Bryson Literary Society in 2005, the journal now operates independently, run by an undergraduate staff and one faculty advisor. The journal is published biannually.
The Skiffler is an independent satire newspaper begun by TCU students in 2010 which parodies the Daily Skiff. Since it began publishing online The Skiffler has developed a popular following on the TCU campus, though contributors to The Skiffler remain mostly anonymous. Previously, the satirical paper on campus was "The Sniff", that disappeared in the early 2000s.

Greek life
Approximately 50% of undergraduate students are active in TCU's Greek system:
 12 social fraternities which are members of the Interfraternity Council (Beta Theta Pi, Delta Tau Delta, Kappa Sigma, Lambda Chi Alpha, Phi Delta Theta, Phi Gamma Delta, Phi Kappa Sigma, Pi Kappa Phi, Sigma Alpha Epsilon, Sigma Chi, Sigma Nu and Sigma Phi Epsilon)
 12 social sororities which are members of the Panhellenic Council (Alpha Chi Omega, Alpha Delta Pi, Chi Omega, Delta Delta Delta, Delta Gamma, Gamma Phi Beta, Kappa Alpha Theta, Kappa Kappa Gamma, Phi Mu, Pi Beta Phi, Sigma Kappa and Zeta Tau Alpha)

TCU is also home to the following Fraternities/Sororities:

 One Christian fraternity, Beta Upsilon Chi, and one Christian sorority, Sigma Phi Lambda.
 One national, co-ed, service fraternity, Alpha Phi Omega.
 Seven members of the National Pan-Hellenic Council (NPHC) (Alpha Kappa Alpha, Delta Sigma Theta, Zeta Phi Beta, Alpha Phi Alpha, Omega Psi Phi, Kappa Alpha Psi, Phi Beta Sigma)
 Six members of the Multi-cultural Greek Council (Lambda Theta Alpha, Lambda Theta Phi, Chi Upsilon Sigma, Sigma Lambda Alpha, Kappa Lambda Delta, Omega Delta Phi)
Dozens of professional and academic organizations, including Phi Beta Kappa and Delta Sigma Pi
Music Fraternities including Mu Phi Epsilon, Phi Mu Alpha Sinfonia, Tau Beta Sigma, and Kappa Kappa Psi.

Sustainability
A "Purple Bike" program was instituted to allow students to use purple bicycles free of charge as an alternative to motor vehicles. Scharbauer Hall, which opened for classes in 2010, is a Gold US Green Building Council's Leadership in Energy and Environmental Design (LEED) certified facility.

In 2010 TCU faculty and staff held a conference for Service-Learning for Sustainability and Social Justice with keynote speaker Robert Egger, founder of D.C. Central Kitchen. Also, sustainability and social justice are emphasized areas in the curriculum and programs offered by the Department of Sociology and Anthropology located in Scharbauer Hall.

Athletics

TCU competes in NCAA Division I athletics as a member of the Big 12 Conference (Big XII). For most of its history (1923–1996), TCU was a member of the now defunct Southwest Conference (SWC). Prior to joining the Big XII in 2012, TCU spent seven years in the Mountain West Conference (MWC) (2005–2011), where they were the only school to join from a conference other than the Western Athletic Conference (WAC), having come from Conference USA (C-USA), of which they were a member from 2001 to 2005. Before joining C-USA, TCU teams competed in the WAC for five years, from 1996 to 2001, after the SWC dissolved.

TCU's varsity sports have eight men's and ten women's squads. Men's sports include baseball, basketball, football, golf, swimming & diving, track & field, cross country and tennis. Women's sports include basketball, volleyball, golf, swimming & diving, cross country, track & field, soccer, rifle, equestrian, and tennis.

In recent years the university has made significant upgrades to its athletics facilities, including construction of the $13 million Abe-Martin Academic Enhancement Center, which was completed in August 2008. The university finished reconstruction of the entire Amon G. Carter Football Stadium in September 2012 at cost of approximately $160 million. The Daniel Meyer Coliseum is currently undergoing a $55 million reconstruction and is scheduled to be completed for the 2014-15 basketball season with expanded seating, concessions, office and locker room space, better sight lines, and luxury fan facilities.

Football

The Horned Frogs have won two national championships, one in 1935 and the other in 1938. Additionally, the team has captured eighteen conference championships. Many notable football players have played for TCU, including Sammy Baugh, Davey O'Brien, Jim Swink, Bob Lilly, LaDainian Tomlinson, and Andy Dalton. 

The Horned Frogs play their home games in Amon G. Carter Stadium. Gary Patterson has coached the team since December 2000, twice winning the AP Coach of the Year Award (2009, 2014) and leading the Horned Frogs to a 178–74 record (.706), including 11 bowl wins in 17 appearances. Under Patterson, the Horned Frogs have owned the No. 1 ranked defense in the country five times (2000, 2002, 2008, 2009, 2010), the second most top defenses by any team since the NCAA began keeping records in 1937 (Alabama has had seven No. 1 defensive rankings since 1937). 

TCU finished the 2010 season as the consensus No. 2 ranked team in the nation after beating the Wisconsin Badgers in the 2011 Rose Bowl and finishing an undefeated 13–0. The Horned Frogs were the first school from a non-automatic qualifying conference to play in the Rose Bowl since the creation of the Bowl Championship Series.  The 2010 team topped the Congrove Computer Rankings, though the school does not claim this national title. The Frogs most recent bowl win was against Michigan in the first round of the College Football Playoff in the Fiesta Bowl on December 31st, 2022.  The Frogs lost to the Georgia Bulldogs in the CFP National Championship 65-7.

Rivalries
The oldest rivalry, which has become nationally famous since TCU joined the Big 12 Conference, is The Revivalry with Baylor University. The Revivalry is unique in that it is a major FBS rivalry between two church affiliated schools. It is also one of the oldest rivalries in the nation, with the series currently led by TCU 54-52-7 since 1899. Since resumption of the annual rivalry in 2010, the series is close, with TCU leading 7–4. Since TCU joined Baylor in the Big 12 in 2012, the Big 12 series record is 6–3 in favor of TCU.

The TCU Horned Frogs also share a historic rivalry with the Southern Methodist University Mustangs, located in Fort Worth's sister (and rival) city, Dallas. In football, teams from TCU and SMU have competed annually in the Battle for the Iron Skillet since 1946 when, during pre-game festivities, an SMU fan was frying Frog Legs as a joke before the game. A TCU fan, seeing this as a desecration of their "Horned Frog", told him that eating the frog legs was going well beyond the rivalry and that they should let the game decide who would get the skillet and the frog legs. SMU won the game, and the skillet and frog legs went to SMU that year. The tradition spilled over into the actual game and the Iron Skillet is now passed to the winner as the rivalry's traveling trophy. TCU leads the all-time series 47–40–7. SMU recently beat TCU 41–38 on September 21, 2019.

Traditionally, TCU's other biggest rivals were also members of the now-defunct Southwest Conference which disbanded in 1996. These rivalries, played only sporadically after 1996 as out of conference games, were renewed when TCU moved to the Big 12 Conference for the 2012 season. After a couple of decades of membership in various other conferences around the U.S. (Western Athletic Conference, Conference USA, the Mountain West Conference and the Big East Conference), TCU now plays regularly with these rivals that, along with Baylor University and Southern Methodist University discussed above, also include The West Texas Championship with Texas Tech University and a long-standing rivalry with The University of Texas at Austin.

TCU has also developed new rivalries. West Virginia University has become a rival largely due to the schools' cohort entry into the Big 12 Conference together in 2012, combined with a toggle of extremely close, dramatic, last-minute wins in their football match ups to date. The rivalry with Boise State University, with which TCU competed on the national stage in the 2000s as the two most prominent "BCS Busters", and which also shared one year together as members of the Mountain West Conference, has also become a major, if periodic, rival. TCU and Boise State competed as the most effective BCS Busters before the demise of the BCS system. In 2011, as members of the Mountain West, TCU won the only in-conference game between the two schools, winning with no time left on a missed Boise State field goal. The rivalry with Boise State will be played only sporadically in the future due to TCU's move to the "Power Conference" Big 12 and Boise State's remaining status as the consensus leader of the "mid-major" programs in the "Group of Five" Conferences.

TCU also maintains a cross-town baseball rivalry with fellow Division I competitor The University of Texas at Arlington.

Notable faculty
Stanley Block, Ph.D., CFA, Emeritus Professor of Finance
Gene A. Smith, Early American historian
Steven E. Woodworth, American Civil War historian

Alumni

TCU has more than 90,000 living alumni.

Business and community leaders

 Beverley Bass - First Female Captain of American Airlines.
 Kyle Bass – Founder and principal of Hayman Capital Management, L.P.
 James Cash, Jr. – Currently sits on boards of GE and Microsoft. Texas Sports Hall of Fame (2014)
 John Davis – Billionaire entrepreneur; 1-800-Flowers founder
 Wendy Davis – State senator and Democratic candidate for governor of Texas in 2014
 Gordon R. England (MBA '75) – 71st and 73rd Secretary of the Navy, Deputy Secretary of Defense (2005–2009)
 S. Maurice Hicks, Jr. - Chief Judge, United States District Court for the Western District of Louisiana
 Kyle Kacal (Certificate in Ranch Management) – member of the Texas House of Representatives from College Station since 2013
 Lois Kolkhorst (Class of 1988) – Republican member of the Texas Senate since 2014 and former member of the Texas House of Representatives
 Maciej Kranz – Cisco Systems Vice President of Innovation
 Robert J. McCann – CEO of UBS Group Americas
 Winthrop Paul Rockefeller – 13th Lieutenant Governor of the US state of Arkansas and member of the Rockefeller family
 Kathryn Farmer - CEO and President of BNSF Railway since 2021. First woman CEO of a Class I railroad.

Arts and entertainment

Norman Alden – character actor 
Richard J. Allen – writer
 Betty Buckley – Tony Award-winning actress best known for playing Grizabella in the musical Cats
 Corby Davidson (attended Aug 1988 thru May 1991, did not graduate) - Dallas/Fort Worth sports radio personality with The Ticket 1310am
 Kelli Finglass – Dallas Cowboys Cheerleaders, director of the Dallas Cowboys Cheerleaders, television personality, television producer
 Skip Hollandsworth – Executive Editor of Texas Monthly magazine
 Kristin Holt – Dallas Cowboys Cheerleaders, finalist on the original American Idol
 Daniel Hunter - known for his music project, Analog Rebellion (formerly PlayRadioPlay!)
 Dan Jenkins – bestselling author and Sports Illustrated writer
 Sue Monk Kidd – bestselling author of The Secret Life of Bees
 Mary McCleary – contemporary artist with works in numerous public collections
 Tudi Roche – actress
 Rod Roddy – former The Price is Right announcer
 Bob Schieffer – journalist with CBS News since 1969 and host of Face the Nation
 Travis Schuldt – television actor best known for his role on Scrubs
 Sarah Rose Summers – Miss USA 2018
 Rob Thomas – writer and creator of Veronica Mars
 Shantel VanSanten – actress best known for playing Quinn James on One Tree Hill
 William Walker – Metropolitan Opera baritone
 Van Williams – television actor on Bourbon Street Beat, Surfside 6, and the Green Hornet
 Travis Willingham – voice actor
 Peggy Willis-Aarnio - Ballet historian

Athletes and coaches

 Jake Arrieta – Pitcher for the Chicago Cubs
 Cameron Norrie - British tennis player
 Ronnie Baker – American sprinter
Desmond Bane - NBA, selected 30th overall in the 2020 NBA Draft, selected for Rising Stars Challenge at  2022 NBA All-Star Game
 Sammy Baugh – Member of the Pro Football Hall of Fame
 Josh Boyce – Wide receiver, New England Patriots
 Tank Carder – Linebacker, Cleveland Browns
 Matt Carpenter – Right fielder, New York Yankees
 Andrew Cashner – Former pitcher, MLB
 Ron Clinkscale – Quarterback, Canadian Football League
 Charles Coody – PGA golf professional, Class of 1960, Texas Sports Hall of Fame (2000)
 Kim Collins – 2003 World 100m Champion
 Andy Dalton (class of 2010) – Quarterback for the New Orleans Saints
 Josh Doctson – Wide receiver for the Minnesota Vikings
 Jamie Dixon – Current TCU men's basketball head coach, and former head coach for the University of Pittsburgh
 Brandon Finnegan – Pitcher for the Cincinnati Reds
 Kris Tschetter - American professional golfer on the LPGA tour
 Clint Gresham – Long snapper for the Seattle Seahawks
 Phil Handler – American football NFL player and coach
 Jerry Hughes – Linebacker for the Buffalo Bills
 Jeremy Kerley – Wide receiver for the New York Jets
 Bob Lilly – Member of the Pro Football Hall of Fame
 Stansly Maponga – Defensive end for the New York Giants
 Lee Nailon - NBA basketball player and 2007 Israeli Basketball Premier League MVP
 Marshall Newhouse – Offensive tackle for the Oakland Raiders
Jeff Newman - MLB All-Star baseball player and manager
 Davey O'Brien – 1938 Heisman Trophy winner
 Joe Robb - Defensive end, Philadelphia Eagles 1959-60, St Louis Cardinals 1961-67, Pro Bowl 1966, Detroit Lions 1968-71, & WFL 1972-74. 
 Angela Stanford – LPGA tour professional
 Jim Swink – Member of the College Football Hall of Fame
 LaDainian Tomlinson – 2006 NFL MVP and 2000 Heisman Trophy finalist
 Kurt Thomas – NBA power forward; led NCAA Division I in scoring and rebounding (1994–95) and was the first TCU player taken in first round of NBA Draft (1995, Miami Heat).
 Johnny Vaught - Head coach of Ole Miss Rebels football
 Jason Verrett – Cornerback for the San Francisco 49ers
 Jeff Gladney – Cornerback for the Minnesota Vikings and the Arizona Cardinals
 Daryl Washington – Linebacker for the Arizona Cardinals
 Kenrich Williams - NBA basketball player for the Oklahoma City Thunder 
 Malcolm Williams – Cornerback for the New England Patriots  
 Robert Lyles- NFL linebacker for Houston Oilers, Atlanta Falcons

Notes

References

External links

TCU Athletics website

 
Protestantism in Texas
Universities and colleges in Fort Worth, Texas
Universities and colleges affiliated with the Christian Church (Disciples of Christ)
Educational institutions established in 1873
Universities and colleges accredited by the Southern Association of Colleges and Schools
1873 establishments in Texas
Private universities and colleges in Texas